Farma ("The Farm") was a Serbian version of the reality TV series The Farm. The show aired in Serbia on RTV Pink, in Montenegro on Pink M and in Bosnia and Herzegovina on Pink BH.

Season 1
Start Date: 20 September 2009
End Date: 23 December 2009
Duration: 95 days
The Prize: €100,000
Main Presenter: Aleksandra Jeftanović & Ognjen Amidžić 
Winner: Milan Topalović "Topalko"
PEGI Descriptor: Fear/Horror

Contestants

Nominations

Season 2
Start Date: 14 March 2010
End Date: 26 June 2010
Duration: 105 days
The Prize: €100,000
Main Presenter: Aleksandra Jeftanović & Ognjen Amidžić
 Winner: Miloš Bojanić
PEGI Descriptor: Bad Language

Contestants

Nominations

Season 3
Start Date: 12 September 2010
End Date: 30 December 2010
Duration: 109 days
The Prize: €100,000
Main Presenter: Aleksandra Jeftanović & Ognjen Amidžić
Winner: Katarina Zivković
PEGI Descriptor: Violence/Gore

Contestants

Nominations

Season 4
Start Date: 19 March 2013
End Date: 7 July 2013
Duration: 110 days
The Prize: €50,000
Main Presenter: Aleksandra Jeftanović & Ognjen Amidžić
Winner: Sulejman Haljevac "Memo"
PEGI Descriptor: Sex/Nudity

Contestants

Nominations

Season 5
Start Date: 1 September 2013
End Date: 30 December 2013
Duration: 120 days
The Prize: €50,000
Main Presenter: Aleksandra Jeftanović & Ognjen Amidžić
Winner: Jelena Golubović
PEGI Descriptor: Discrimination

Contestants

Nominations

Season 6
Start Date: 27 August 2015
End Date: 30 December 2015
Duration: 126 days
The Prize: €50,000
Main Presenter: Ognjen Amidžić, Dušica Jakovljević & sometimes Aleksandra Jeftanović
Winner: Stanija Dobrojević
PEGI Descriptor: Drugs

Contestants

Nominations

Season 7
Start Date: 15 February 2016
End Date: 29 June 2016
Duration: 136 days
The Prize: €50,000
Main Presenter: Ognjen Amidžić, Dušica Jakovljević, Katarina Nikolić & sometimes Vladimir Stanojević
Winner: Jelena Golubović
PEGI Descriptor: Gambling
'''This season of "the reality farm" was the longest in the world.

Contestants

Nominations

Notes 

The Farm (franchise)
2009 Serbian television series debuts
Serbian reality television series
2010s Serbian television series
RTV Pink original programming